Ballan  is a small town in the state of Victoria, Australia located  on the Werribee River,  northwest of Melbourne.

It is the main administrative centre for the Shire of Moorabool local government area. Ballan is a small country regional town but also not too far from Melbourne City which takes a one-hour drive. Ballan Town is located in between Melbourne - Ballarat Western Freeway and had a major train stop in between these two cities. Ballan's facilities include a hospital, primary schools, railway station, police station, post office, church, banks, ATM, public play grounds, golf club, hotel, pub, caravan park, fuel station, restaurants, supermarket and other shops. During the Victorian Gold Rush, it became an important staging point for coaches travelling to the Ballarat goldfields.

History
The area around Ballan was part of the tribal area of the Wautharong people, part of the Kulin nation. The area was rich in fauna, including kangaroo, kangaroo rats, bandicoots, dingos, and two species of native cat. Many species had vanished by the end of the 19th century, with European settlement.

The first European settlers crossed Bass Strait landing near Geelong and worked their way up the Moorabool River with their sheep flocks. Robert von Steiglitz first settled the area in 1838; he named the area after Ballan in Ireland. Other early settler names included Cowie, Stead, Wallace and Egerton.

There were clashes between indigenous Australians and white settlers during settlement. Robert von Steiglitz stated in his journal 
"… it may be questioned by some feather-bed philanthropist whether we had the right to take the country from the blacks but I believe the general rule is that if people cultivate or graze the land they have a claim to it. These creatures did neither …".

Gold was found in the area in 1851, which brought an influx of prospectors during the Victorian Gold Rush. The Ballan Hotel dates from the gold rush period in 1851. The town became an important staging point for coaches travelling to the Ballarat goldfields. The post office in the township opened around September 1853, although two earlier offices in the area were named Ballan.

Ballan Primary School was established on 8 January 1855.

The first Mechanics' Institute in Ballan was built in 1861, with the current Mechanics' Institute built on land purchased in 1881, although the façade was demolished and rebuilt in 1922. The building houses the library for the town and a hall.

St Paul’s Presbyterian Church in Ballan was officially opened in July 1866.

Ballan Magistrates' Court closed on 1 January 1983.

On 15 November 2003, a Sprinter train travelling to Ballarat was derailed between Ballan and Gordon, injuring 61 people when it hit a stationary vehicle on a country railway crossing.

Health service 
 Ballan District Health & Care: Located at 33 Cowie Street, Ballan Hospital is a community-owned, registered charity, with 170+ staff members and 70+ volunteers, providing healthcare and wellbeing services for Ballan and surrounding districts. There is a ongoing demand for allowing a Maternity Ward in Ballan Hospital for years.
 Private Medical Centre's also functioning in town with GP Consultation

Education
There are 2 Primary Schools in Ballan. Ballan Primary School and St Brigid's Catholic Primary School. There is a Child Care Centre also functioning in town. For High School, students goes to Bacchus Marsh, Ballarat or Daylesford. There are Bus Services for students to these towns. There is a ongoing demand for allowing a High School in Ballan for years.

Transport
The Western Freeway bypasses the town, but is located nearby and connects Ballan to Melbourne in the east and Ballarat to the west.  The main road into town, the Old Melbourne Road (Old Inglis Street), is also the main street. Another main roads are the Geelong - Ballan Road and Daylesford - Ballan Road.

Ballan railway station is serviced by regular fast regional Ballarat V/Line rail service VLocity approximately hourly with a 1 hour journey to the state's regional railway hub Southern Cross station in Melbourne - or 20 minute journey to Ballarat.  Being on the Serviceton line trains stopping at the station give Ballan access via Ballarat to regional services including the Ararat V/Line rail service, the Mildura line as far as Maryborough and connecting bus services. The town centre is only a three-block walk from the station. Train to Ballarat and Melbourne are running at a frequency of 20 minutes in Busy Times and 40 minutes in Normal Day Time starting from 4 in morning to 11 at Night.

VLine coaches also regularly stop in Ballan en route from Ballarat to Melbourne, and Ballarat Airport shuttle buses run from the Ballan Police Station Bus Stop to Melbourne Airport.  Ballan Bus Lines also runs on all weekdays bus services to Daylesford (Hepburn Springs) and Gordon (Mount Egerton).

Nearest major airports are Melbourne Airport and Avalon Airport. There is also a local taxi service based in Ballan.

Sport
The town has an Australian rules football team competing in the Central Highlands Football League.

Ballan Brumbies Basketball Club was founded in 2017, playing in the Ballarat Basketball Association competitions. As of March 2018, the club fielded men's & ladies' senior teams, as well as 14 junior teams. The club's colours are white, royal blue & gold.

The Ballan Cricket Club currently has 2 Senior and 3 Junior teams competing in the Ballarat Cricket Association. The seniors in BCA 2nd grade & One day C grade whilst the Juniors are U12 in the MJCA, U13 & U16 with the BCA. The club has been back with the BCA since the 2005/06 season after 14 years in the Daylesford & District Cricket Association.

The Ballan Bowling Club currently fields three pennant teams in the Ballarat District Bowls Division.

Golfers play at the Ballan Golf Club on Blow Court.

Ballan Football Club is currently involved in the Central Highlands football netball league. They offer a chance for both junior footballers and netballers to play, as well as 2 senior football and 3 senior netball teams.

Festivals and attractions

 A Vintage Machinery and Vehicle Rally is held in February, well known for its vintage tractor pull.
 An Autumn Festival is held in Ballan every year in late March.
 BuzzConf, a technology and futurist festival, is held in Ballan every November.
 Although there is a mineral spring at Ballan, it does not have the high profile of the towns of Hepburn Springs and Daylesford further to the north.
 To the south of Ballan are the Brisbane Ranges National Park and the You Yangs Forest Park.

Community Groups

 Ballan & District CWA - The Ballan CWA was established in September 1937; and the first meeting was held at Mrs. Rae's Coffee Palace. A committee was established and was run by Mrs J Rhodes (President), Mrs Turley (Secretary) & Mrs A.Flack (Treasurer) and consisted of 10 other members. For 70 years, the office bearers have passed on the torch to their fellow sisters, keeping alive the traditions, recipes & spirit of the CWA. The Ballan branch has had 34 presidents, 12 secretaries & 9 treasurers, with some members serving multiple terms. During these 70 years, the extraordinary country women of the CWA Ballan branch had helped those in need by raising funds for medical, war and other charity groups. This was achieved by donations, providing entertainment, volunteering at the Ballarat Hospital, penny drives, hosting events such as debutante balls, film evenings, sports competitions, and were widely known and were in high demand for their catering. In 2007, the last group said their farewells. After a 9 year hiatus, (October 2016) the Ballan & District CWA branch was established with a fresh set of members, goals and attitudes. "Our branch is passionate about supporting our local & surrounding communities within the Moorabool Shire & of course bakes the best scones. One of the marvellous things about being part of a community, is that it enables us to welcome, connect & support people in ways we couldn't as individuals."

See also
 Ballan railway station, Victoria

References

External links

 Ballan District Health & Care
 Ballan Online
 Ballan & District CWA

Towns in Victoria (Australia)